Markus Roger Owen is an applied mathematician working in a diverse field of subjects. This has included research into macrophage-tumour interactions, neural field theories, juxtacrine intercellular signalling, the effect of predation on biological invasions, mode-locking of periodically stimulated bursting neurons, lung ventilation and rheumatoid arthritis. Owen is currently a Professor in applied mathematics at the University of Nottingham's School of Mathematical Sciences.

Awards 

In July 2009, Owen was awarded the Whitehead Prize by the London Mathematical Society for his contributions to the development of multiscale modelling approaches in systems medicine and biology.

Publications

References 

Academics of the University of Nottingham
Living people
Whitehead Prize winners
Year of birth missing (living people)